A heritage tree is typically a large, individual tree with unique value, which is considered irreplaceable. The major criteria for heritage tree designation are age, rarity, and size, as well as aesthetic, botanical, ecological, and historical value. Heritage tree ordinances are developed to place limits upon the removal of these trees; the ordinances are oriented towards a specific tree, not a woodland. Heritage trees in Singapore are protected by law under the Heritage Trees Scheme adopted on 17 August 2001. The oak is depicted as England's heritage tree.

In the US, the first state-sponsored heritage tree program began in 1995 in Oregon with the Giant Sitka Spruce. In Iowa, the Living Heritage Tree Museum contains descendants of famous trees. In the state of Washington, there are several categories of heritage trees, such as Historical, Specimen, Rare, or Significant Grove.

The city of Portland, Oregon maintains a database of trees designated as heritage trees.

References

Cultural heritage
Environmental protection
Individual trees